The Chronicles of Lucius Leffing is a collection of supernatural, detective short stories by Joseph Payne Brennan.  It was first published in 1977 by Donald M. Grant, Publisher, Inc. in an edition of 1,540 copies.  The stories feature Brennan's supernatural detective, Lucius Leffing.  Many of the stories originally appeared in Alfred Hitchcock's Mystery Magazine.

Contents

 Foreword, by Frank Belknap Long
 "The Case of the Hertzell Inheritance"
 "The Case of the Mystified Vendor"
 "The Apple Orchard Murder Case"
 "Mem'ries"
 "The Murder of Mr. Matthews"
 "The Possible Suspects"
 "The Dead of Winter Apparition"
 "The Nightmare Face"

References

1977 short story collections
Mystery short story collections
Horror short story collections
Donald M. Grant, Publisher books